Róbert Szelepcsényi (born 19 August 1966, Žilina) is a Slovak computer scientist of Hungarian descent and a member of the Faculty of Mathematics, Physics and Informatics of Comenius University in Bratislava.

His results on the closure of non-deterministic space under complement, independently obtained in 1987 also by Neil Immerman (the result known as the Immerman–Szelepcsényi theorem), brought the Gödel Prize of ACM and EATCS to both of them in 1995.

Scientific articles
 Róbert Szelepcsényi: The Method of Forced Enumeration for Nondeterministic Automata. Acta Informatica 26(3): 279-284 (1988)

References

Slovak computer scientists
Hungarian computer scientists
20th-century Hungarian mathematicians
21st-century Hungarian mathematicians
Theoretical computer scientists
Comenius University alumni
Gödel Prize laureates
Hungarians in Slovakia
Slovak people of Hungarian descent
Living people
1966 births